Tom Clancy's Op-Center: Acts of War is a technothriller by Jeff Rovin

Plot introduction 
The mobile Regional Operations Center (ROC) in Turkey investigates a dam blown up by Kurdish militants. The ROC is later taken hostage by the Kurdish militants who blew the dam.

Characters in Tom Clancy's Op-Center: Acts of War 
 Mike Rodgers- General, in charge of ROC
 Paul Hood
 Lowell Coffey II- Attorney, 40, civilian assigned to ROC
 Ibrahim al-Rashid- Syrian Kurd
 Mahmoud al-Rashid- Syrian Kurd
 Dr. Phil Katzen- Biophysicist, 33, cilivan assigned to ROC
 Dr. Mary Rose Mohalley- Computer programmer, 29, civilian assigned to ROC

Major themes
The desire of the Kurdish people for an independent state. The novel implies that the Kurds from Syria, Turkey, and Iraq work together to force a war between the government of Turkey and Syria, with the eventual goal of being granted an individual territory.
Injustices suffered by the Kurds at the hands of the governments of the nations they live in.
Volatility of Middle-East region, both politically and ideologically

Release details
The novel was released in 1997, prior to the attack on the World Trade Center towers and the subsequent invasion of Afghanistan and Iraq, but after the establishment of an Iraqi Kurdistan in Iraq from the aftermath of the Gulf War.

1997 American novels
American thriller novels
Techno-thriller novels
Novels by Jeff Rovin
Tom Clancy's Op-Center
Novels set in Turkey
HarperCollins books